Peter Sládek (born July 7, 1989) is a Slovak footballer who plays for OK Častkovce as a forward or a winger.

Club career
He made his league debut for Spartak Myjava against Žilina on 13 July 2012.

Sládek was originally presented as a late new signing of newly promoted Oostende at the end of the summer 2013 transfer window, but the transfer was cancelled a few days later as an administrative error has caused the transfer to be ruled invalid by the FIFA. Two months later, near the end of October, FIFA finally allowed the transfer to go through.

References

External links
Spartak Myjava profile 
Corgoň Liga profile 

Eurofotbal.cz profile 

1989 births
Living people
People from Myjava
Sportspeople from the Trenčín Region
Association football midfielders
Slovak footballers
1. FC Slovácko players
MFK Vítkovice players
Expatriate footballers in Belgium
Expatriate footballers in the Czech Republic
Spartak Myjava players
K.V. Oostende players
Podbeskidzie Bielsko-Biała players
FC ViOn Zlaté Moravce players
ŠK Odeva Lipany players
Expatriate footballers in Poland
Slovak Super Liga players
Belgian Pro League players